Karl-Wilhelm Welwei (17 October 1930 – 25 August 2013) was a German historian. He was regarded as one of the most notable experts on the history of Ancient Greece.

Biography
Welwei was born on 17 October 1930 in Witten. He studied history and classical philology at the University of Cologne. In 1963, he received a PhD under the tutorage of Hans Volkmann, and earned his habilitation in 1970 at the Ruhr-Universität Bochum. Between 1972 and 1996 he was Professor of Ancient History. Since 1993 he has been a member of the German Archaeological Institute.

Many of Welwei's books, including Die griechische Polis, Athen, Das klassische Athen have reached a standard status. The focus of his research, in addition to Ancient Greece are the Republic and Imperial epochs of Ancient Rome.

Works
Books
 Athen. Vom neolithischen Siedlungsplatz zur archaischen Großpolis. Wissenschaftliche Buchgesellschaft, Darmstadt 1992, .
 Die griechische Frühzeit 2000 bis 500 v. Chr. (Becksche Reihe; 2185). 2nd Edition. Beck Wissen, München 2007, .
 Die griechische Polis. Verfassung und Gesellschaft in archaischer und klassischer Zeit. 2nd Edition. Verlag Steiner, Stuttgart 1998, .
 Das klassische Athen. Demokratie und Machtpolitik im 5. und 4. Jahrhundert v. Chr. Primus-Verlag, Darmstadt 1999, .
 Sparta. Aufstieg und Niedergang einer antiken Großmacht. Klett-Cotta, Stuttgart 2004, .

Essays
 Römische Herrschaftsideologie und augusteische Germanienpolitik. In: Gymnasium Volume 93, 1986, p. 118 ff.
 The Peloponnesian War and its Aftermath. In: Konrad Kinzl (Hrsg.): A Companion to the Classical Greek World. Blackwell, Malden, Ma. 2008, .

References
 Curriculum Vitae Ruhr-Universität Bochum.

1930 births
2013 deaths
20th-century German historians
Academic staff of Ruhr University Bochum
German male non-fiction writers
21st-century German historians